William Charles Frederick Grover-Williams (born William Charles Frederick Grover, 16 January 1903 – 18 March 1945 (or shortly thereafter)), also known as "W Williams", was a British Grand Prix motor racing driver and special agent who worked for the Special Operations Executive (SOE) inside France. As a racing driver, he is best known for winning the first Monaco Grand Prix and as an SOE agent he organised and coordinated the Chestnut network, before being captured and executed by the Nazis.

Personal and early life
Grover-Williams was born in Montrouge, Hauts-de-Seine, France, on 16 January 1903 to Frederick and Hermance Grover. Frederick Grover was an English horse breeder who had settled in Montrouge. Frederick met a French woman, Hermance Dagan, and they were soon married. Their first child was Elizabeth, born in 1897. William had two other siblings – Alice and Frederic. Born to an English father and a French mother, Grover-Williams grew up fluent in both the French and English languages.

When William was eleven, he was sent to live with relatives in Hertfordshire, in the United Kingdom. After the war, Frederick Grover moved the family to Monte Carlo. It was there that William developed a fascination for automobiles, having been taught to drive a Rolls-Royce by his sister's boyfriend. Grover-Williams passed his driving test whilst in Monaco and was granted a licence. Mechanically inclined, and fascinated by motorised vehicles, at the age of 15, Grover-Williams acquired an Indian motorcycle and it became his pride and joy. He would later go on to compete in motorcycle races in the early 1920s, although he kept it secret from his family by adopting the pseudonym, "W Williams".

In 1919, the Irish portrait painter, William Orpen became the official artist of the Paris Peace Conference. Orpen bought a Rolls-Royce car and hired Grover-Williams, who had returned to Paris, as his chauffeur. At the time, Orpen had a mistress named Yvonne Aupicq. Aupicq and Grover-Williams became good friends and, after the collapse of Aupicq's relationship with Orpen, the pair were married in November 1929.

Racing career

By 1926, Grover-Williams had begun racing a Bugatti in races throughout France, using the alias, "W Williams", entering the Grand Prix de Provence at Miramas and the Monte Carlo Rally. In 1928, he won the French Grand Prix, repeating in 1929. That same year, driving a Bugatti 35B, painted in what would become known as "British racing green", he won the inaugural Monaco Grand Prix beating the heavily favoured Mercedes of the great German driver, Rudolf Caracciola.

Successful financially, Grover-Williams and his wife maintained a home in a fashionable district of Paris while owning a large house in the resort town of La Baule, Pays de la Loire, on the Bay of Biscay, which was home to one of the annual Grand Prix races. In 1931, he won the Belgian Grand Prix at Spa-Francorchamps. He also won the Grand Prix de la Baule in three consecutive years (1931 to 1933). Then his career waned and he was out of racing by the latter part of the 1930s.

Second World War
Following the German occupation of France in the Second World War, Grover-Williams fled to England where he joined the Royal Army Service Corps. Due to his fluency in French and English, he was recruited into the Special Operations Executive (SOE) to foster the French Resistance. He recruited fellow racing driver Robert Benoist and together they worked in the Paris region to build up a successful circuit of operatives, forming sabotage cells and reception committees for Allied parachute operations.

On 2 August 1943, Grover-Williams was arrested by the Sicherheitsdienst and underwent lengthy interrogation before being deported to Berlin and was then held prisoner in the Sachsenhausen concentration camp.

Death
Grover-Williams was executed at Sachsenhausen in the spring of 1945, along with fellow SOE network leader Francis Suttill. The date of death shown on the official War Office casualty lists, originally "On or shortly after 1.2.1945" has been amended to read "On or shortly after 18.3.1945", while the Commonwealth War Graves Commission records the date simply as 18 March 1945.

No evidence has been found to support speculation that Grover-Williams survived the war and lived on under an assumed identity as "Georges Tambal", who allegedly lived with Grover-Williams' widow for many years.

Legacy and recognition

Grover-Williams is recorded on the Brookwood Memorial in Surrey, England, and as one of the SOE agents who died for the liberation of France, he is listed on the Valençay SOE Memorial's Roll of Honour in the French town of Valençay.

Grover-Williams was recommended for an Order of the British Empire by the head of the SOE, Major-General Colin Gubbins, in September 1945, but when it became clear that he had died the honour was not awarded.

The Saboteur, a 2009 video game, features an Irish protagonist named Sean Devlin who is inspired by Grover-Williams.

A statue of Grover-Williams in his 1929 Monaco Grand Prix-winning Bugatti Type 35 is located at the first corner of the Circuit de Monaco (Sainte-Dévote Chapel). The statue is temporarily moved a couple of meters during the yearly Monaco Grand Prix and the biannual Monaco ePrix and Historic Grand Prix of Monaco.

Results and records

Grand Prix wins

Complete European Championship results
(key) (Races in bold indicate pole position)

References

Books

 (A novel based on Grover-Williams's life.)

Notes

1903 births
1945 deaths
British Army personnel killed in World War II
British people executed in Nazi concentration camps
Bugatti people
Chauffeurs
English expatriates in Monaco
English people of French descent
English racing drivers
Executed people from Île-de-France
Executed spies
French Resistance members
Grand Prix drivers
Resistance members killed by Nazi Germany
People from Montrouge
People who died in Sachsenhausen concentration camp
British Army General List officers
Spies who died in Nazi concentration camps
French Special Operations Executive personnel
British Special Operations Executive personnel
Sportspeople from Hauts-de-Seine
European Championship drivers